Coatbridge Central railway station is a station in Coatbridge, North Lanarkshire, Scotland. It is on the Argyle Line. Train services are provided by ScotRail.

Architecture and history
The station was originally named Coatbridge and opened in 1842. It was renamed Coatbridge Central in 1953 after the 1826 Monkland and Kirkintilloch Railway station named Coatbridge Central closed in 1951. It is on what was originally the Garnkirk and Glasgow Railway, which later became the Glasgow, Garnkirk and Coatbridge Railway. The connection southwards came courtesy of the Wishaw and Coltness Railway, with their first passenger train arriving from Morningside in May 1845. Both companies were taken over by the Caledonian Railway in 1849.

The existing station layout is the result of a re-build by the Caledonian Railway in 1900, but the platform level buildings were demolished in the 1970s when the station was a likely candidate for closure due to dwindling patronage and services.

All of these workings had been either withdrawn or diverted by 1987, but by then Strathclyde PTE had introduced a regular local service from Motherwell as an extension of the Argyle Line's Hamilton Circle route (the line through here had been electrified by British Rail in 1981 to allow electrically hauled freight trains to access the nearby Gartsherrie container terminal). That provided the main service from the station up until the May 2014 timetable change, as Argyle Line trains only called here at peak periods. Electrification was extended north to Cumbernauld in 2014 as part of the Edinburgh to Glasgow Improvement Programme upgrade scheme, and thereafter all passenger trains began to be worked by EMUs. Following a timetable recast in December 2014, Motherwell services once again run on through via the Hamilton Circle to the city's north west suburbs throughout the day.

Access to the station is now by a ramp from West Canal Street leading to the Down (Cumbernauld bound) platform with access to the Motherwell-bound island platform via the original underpass. Original access to both platforms of the station was via this underpass from the category C(S) listed two-floor structure at the end of the station. The main building was disused for many years after the removal of staffing in the 1970s, but was renovated in the early 2000s and used initially as a public house and more recently as commercial premises for an office supplies company.

With a container terminal just north of the station, and the location on link between the West Coast Main Line and the lines to Grangemouth, Stirling and points north, there are also freight trains passing through the station.

Facilities
Amenities here are somewhat basic: the station is unmanned, and no permanent buildings remain on the platforms apart from standard waiting shelters. There are timetable poster boards and customer help points on each platform. CCTV cameras and an automatic announcement system are also installed here. Step-free access is only possible on platform 2, as the underpass to the opposite side has steps.

Passenger services

2006-2014
An hourly train operates to Motherwell and Cumbernauld Mondays to Saturdays. This is operated as a  diagram.

2014 onwards
With the electrification of the Cumbernauld Line, services now operate with electric traction. The hourly Motherwell-Cumbernauld service (since 14 December 2014) interworks with Argyle Line services all day, originating at Dalmuir and running via Clydebank and the Hamilton Circle. Some additional services run at peak times.

There is no Sunday service.

References

Notes

Sources
 
 
 
 

Railway stations in North Lanarkshire
Former Caledonian Railway stations
Railway stations in Great Britain opened in 1842
SPT railway stations
Railway stations served by ScotRail
1842 establishments in Scotland
Coatbridge